Andrew Duggan (December 28, 1923 – May 15, 1988) was an American character actor. His work includes 185 screen credits between 1949 and 1987 for roles in both film and television, as well a number more on stage.

Background
Duggan was born in Franklin in Johnson County in central Indiana. During World War II, he served in the United States Army 40th Special Services Company, led by actor Melvyn Douglas in the China Burma India Theater of World War II. His contact with Douglas later led to his performing with Lucille Ball in the play Dreamgirl. Duggan developed a friendship with Broadway director Daniel Mann on a troop ship when returning from the war. Duggan appeared on Broadway in The Rose Tattoo, Gently Does It, Anniversary Waltz, Fragile Fox, and The Third Best Sport.

Duggan appeared in some 70 films and in more than 140 television programs between 1949 and 1987. In film he appeared in Westerns, war pictures, political thrillers, dramas, horror films, and other genres, generally assaying authority figures.  Among his roles were playing a pastor and padre, sheriff and warden, doctor and professor, numerous judges and generals, and three times the President of the United States.

Duggan was the main character in the Disney theme parks' Carousel of Progress and the singer of the accompanying song, The Best Time of Your Life, subsequently updated with new voices and songs in 1993.  Duggan also did voice-over work including Ziebart's 1985 Clio Award-winning "Friend of the Family (Rust in Peace)" television commercial.

On film, television, and stage
In 1957, Duggan appeared as Major Ellwood in the TV Western Cheyenne in the episode titled "Land Beyond the Law". He also appeared in the TV series Gunsmoke in the episode titled “Cheap Labor” in 1957.  Duggan also played a villain in the first episode of NBC's Wagon Train, starring Ward Bond. That same year, Duggan was cast with Peter Brown and Bob Steele in the guest cast of the first episode of the ABC/Warner Bros. series, Colt .45, starring Wayde Preston as Christopher Colt, an undercover agent and pistol salesman in the Old West. In the opening episode, "The Peacemaker" or "Judgment Day", Duggan plays Jim Rexford; Brown is cast as Dave, and Steele as Sergeant Granger.

He made three Westerns for Columbia Pictures in 1957 and 1958.

In 1959, Duggan was contracted to Warner Brothers Television where he was cast in ABC's Bourbon Street Beat, in which he portrayed Cal Calhoun, the head of a New Orleans detective agency. When Bourbon Street Beat was canceled after a single season, the two other detectives in the series were transferred to other Warner Bros. detective series: Van Williams as Kenny Madison remained in the same time slot with a new series Surfside 6. Richard Long as Rex Randolph assumed ailing Roger Smith's position on the hit series 77 Sunset Strip.

In 1962, Duggan starred in the sitcom Room for One More, with co-stars Peggy McCay, Ronnie Dapo, and Tim Rooney, a son of Mickey Rooney. The series was based on a Cary Grant movie with Duggan playing Grant's part, and involved a couple with two children who adopt two others.

During this time, Duggan guest-starred in several Warner Bros. television series and appeared in several Warner Bros. films, including The Chapman Report and Merrill's Marauders, and the television pilot FBI Code 98. He also provide narration for several Warner Bros. film trailers.

Duggan guest-starred in numerous television series in the 1960s, including the Western Tombstone Territory in the episode "The Epitaph". He appeared as an incorrigible criminal trying to gain amnesty in the 1962 episode "Sunday" of the ABC/WB series, Lawman, starring John Russell. In 1963, he guest-starred on the short-lived ABC/WB Western series, The Dakotas.

Duggan was cast on Jack Palance's ABC circus drama, The Greatest Show on Earth and the NBC medical drama about psychiatry, The Eleventh Hour in the role of Carl Quincy in the 1963 episode entitled "Four Feet in the Morning". He played the over-protective Police Chief Dixon in the 1963 spring break film Palm Springs Weekend, in which he attempts to prevent his daughter (Bunny Dixon played by Stefanie Powers) from seeing student Jim Munroe (Troy Donahue). In 1965, he appeared on David Janssen's ABC series, The Fugitive. Duggan had recurring roles on CBS's 90-minute Western, Cimarron Strip, and on ABC's The Great Adventure.  Duggan had a recurring role as General Ed Britt in the second and third seasons of the ABC war series, Twelve O'Clock High. He appeared on the NBC Westerns Jefferson Drum, Bonanza, and The Big Valley, and was also in the pilot episodes of both NBC's The Restless Gun and CBS's Hawaii Five-O, as a former prisoner and an intelligence agent, respectively

He performed in a pivotal supporting role in the 1964 film, Seven Days in May starring Burt Lancaster, Kirk Douglas, Ava Gardner and Fredric March, and played the U.S. President and an imposter in the 1967 film, In Like Flint with James Coburn. Duggan was cast in a 1964 episode of The Alfred Hitchcock Hour entitled "The McGregor Affair". In this segment, he portrays a man who finally determines a way to get rid of his drunken wife, only to later regret what he had done and becomes a victim of the same fate he had planned for his wife.

In 1966, he played Father Michael in "The Eighth Day", an episode of Bob Hope Presents the Chrysler Theatre.  Also, in 1966, Duggan appeared on F Troop as Major Chester Winster, in the episode "The New I. G.". He also played Brigadier/Major General Ed Britt (seasons two and three) in the ABC TV series 12 O'clock High.

Duggan played a leading role as cattle baron Murdoch Lancer in the 1968–1970 series Lancer. (Quentin Tarantino fictionalized the shooting of an episode of the series in both the movie version and his novel Once Upon a Time in Hollywood, although Duggan's character did not appear in either one.)

Duggan played John Walton in the television film The Homecoming: A Christmas Story (1971). In the TV series it inspired, The Waltons, the role of John Walton was played by Ralph Waite. Even earlier, Henry Fonda had played essentially the same role in the movie based on Earl Hamner's writing that inspired them both, Spencer's Mountain (1963), although the character's name was different.

In 1973, Duggan had a cameo appearance in the blaxploitation film Black Caesar. In 1974, he portrayed General Maxwell D. Taylor in the TV docudrama The Missiles Of October. He appeared as FBI Inspector Ryder in the 1975 NBC-TV movie Attack on Terror: The FBI vs. the Ku Klux Klan, and had roles in the 1976 TV miniseries Rich Man, Poor Man and Once an Eagle. In 1978, he appeared in the episode "And the Sea Shall Give Up Her Dead" of the NBC crime drama The Eddie Capra Mysteries. In 1980, he appeared as Sam Wiggins in the ABC television movie The Long Days of Summer, and later that same year guest-starred in an episode of the CBS series M*A*S*H* as Col. Alvin 'Howitzer Al' Houlihan, the legendary father of Margaret Houlihan, in the episode "Father's Day". One of Duggan's last parts was as Dwight D. Eisenhower in a TV biography called J. Edgar Hoover (1987), a role he had played earlier in the NBC miniseries, Backstairs at the White House (1979). He also played President Lyndon B. Johnson in a different biography of Hoover, The Private Files of J. Edgar Hoover (1977). He played Judge Axel in A Return to Salem's Lot (1987).

Personal life
In 1954, he married Broadway dancer and actress Elizabeth Logue, whom he called Betty. The couple had three children, Richard, Nancy, and Melissa.

Duggan died of throat cancer on May 15, 1988, aged 64.

Partial filmography

Film

Patterns (1956) - Mr. Jameson
Three Brave Men (1956) - Pastor Stephen Browning
Domino Kid (1957) - Wade Harrington
Decision at Sundown (1957) - Sheriff Swede Hansen
Return to Warbow (1958) - Murray Fallam
The Bravados (1958) - Padre
Westbound (1959) - Clay Putnam
Splendor in the Grass (1961) - Trailer Narrator (voice, uncredited)
House of Women (1962) - Warden Frank Cole
Merrill's Marauders (1962) - Capt. Abraham Lewis Kolodny, MD
The Chapman Report (1962) - Dr. George C. Chapman
PT 109 (1963) - Narrator (uncredited)
Palm Springs Weekend (1963) - Police Chief Dixon
The Incredible Mr. Limpet (1964) - Harlock
Seven Days in May (1964) - Col. William 'Mutt' Henderson
The Glory Guys (1965) - Gen. Frederick McCabe
In Like Flint (1967) - U.S. President Trent
The Secret War of Harry Frigg (1968) - Gen. Newton Armstrong
Skin Game (1971) - Mr. Calloway
Bone (1972) - Bill
Black Caesar (1973) - Man at Shoeshine (uncredited)
It's Alive (1974) - The Professor
The Bears and I (1974) - Commissioner Gaines
The Missiles of October (1974) - Gen. Maxwell Taylor, Army Chief of Staff
The Deadliest Season (1977) - Al Miller
The Private Files of J. Edgar Hoover (1977) - Pres. Lyndon B. Johnson
It Lives Again (1978) - Dr. Perry
A Fire in the Sky (1978) - President
The Incredible Journey of Doctor Meg Laurel (1979) - Judge Adamson
Frankenstein Island (1981) - The Colonel
Doctor Detroit (1983) - Harmon Rousehorn
A Return to Salem's Lot (1987) - Judge Axel (final film role)

Television
Wagon Train (1957 first episode)
Gunsmoke (1957 episode: "Cheap Labor") - Fos Capper
Cheyenne (1956 episode: "The Bounty Killers") as Marshall Frank Moxon, (1957 episode: "Land Beyond the Law") as Major Ellwood, (1958 episode: "The Angry Sky") as Granger Ward (Black Jack), and (1963 in the series finale "Showdown at Oxbend") as Ed Foster.
Maverick (1961 episode: "The Ice Man") - Calvin Powers
Bonanza (1964 episode: "The Lila Conrad Story") - Judge David Knowlton
Alfred Hitchcock Hour (1964 episode: "The McGregor Affair") - McGregor
The Big Valley 2 episodes: "Forty Rifles" as Wallant and "The Haunted Gun" as Senator Jud Robson
12 O’Clock High (series 2/3, Major General Ed Britt)
The Fugitive (1966 episode:  "Shadow of the Swan") - Harry Anderson
The FBI (1967 episode: "A Question of Guilt") - Lt. Harris
Lancer (TV series) (1968-1970) Murdoch Lancer
Hawaii Five-O (1968 Episode: "The Cocoon")
The Homecoming: A Christmas Story (1971 TV movie) - John Walton, Sr. 
Mission Impossible (1971 episode: "A Ghost Story") - Justin Bainbridge
Cannon (1972 episode: "The Endangered Species") as Bill Coates, (1976 episode: "The Quasar Kill") as Dr. Lawrence
The Streets of San Francisco (1974 episode: "Target: Red")
Wonder Woman (1979 episode: "The Starships Are Coming" as Mason Steele
Backstairs at the White House (1979 TV miniseries) - President Dwight D. Eisenhower
M*A*S*H (1980 episode: "Father's Day") - Margaret Houlihan's father Col. Alvin 'Howitzer Al' Houlihan
Hart to Hart (1983 episode: "Bahama Bound Harts") - Loring Nichols
Highway To Heaven (1985 episode: "An Investment in Caring") - Crawford
Remington Steele (Steele Blue Yonder)

References

External links

 
 

1923 births
1988 deaths
American male film actors
American male television actors
Male actors from Indiana
Deaths from cancer in California
People from Franklin, Indiana
Warner Bros. contract players
20th-century American male actors
Western (genre) television actors
Deaths from esophageal cancer
Male Western (genre) film actors